2020 State Basketball League season may refer to:

2020 MSBL season, Men's SBL season
2020 WSBL season, Women's SBL season